Aliabad-e Sartol or Aliabad-e Sar Tol may refer to:
 Aliabad-e Sar Tol, Fars
 Aliabad-e Sartol, Kohgiluyeh and Boyer-Ahmad